The Football Association Community Shield (formerly the Charity Shield) is English football's annual match contested at Wembley Stadium between the champions of the previous Premier League season and the holders of the FA Cup. If the Premier League champions also won the FA Cup, then the league runners-up provide the opposition. The fixture is recognised as a competitive super cup by The Football Association and UEFA.

Organised by the FA, proceeds from the game are distributed to community initiatives and charities around the country. Revenue from the gate receipts and match programme sales is distributed to the 124 clubs who competed in the FA Cup from the first round onwards, for onward distribution to charities and projects of their choice, while the remainder is distributed to the FA's national charity partners. The fixture was first played in the 1908–09 season, replacing the Sheriff of London Charity Shield.

The current holders are FA Cup winners Liverpool, who defeated Premier League winners Manchester City 3–1 in the 2022 match.

History
The Community Shield evolved from the Sheriff of London Charity Shield that had been introduced in 1898 as a professionals vs amateurs cup (the gentlemen and players tradition). The Football Association Charity Shield, as it was known at the time, was designed to replace the Sheriff of London Charity Shield after the leading amateur clubs fell out with the FA. The new format was to have the Football League First Division champions play the Southern League champions, and the first match was in 1908 between Manchester United (the First Division champions) and Queens Park Rangers (the Southern League champions). The match was drawn 1–1, so the game was replayed when Manchester United won 4–0. This is the only Charity Shield game to go to a replay. Both games were played at Stamford Bridge.

The competition format varied over the years: in 1913 the Shield was contested between Amateurs and Professionals XIs, while in 1921 the Shield was contested between the Football League and FA Cup winners for the first time. The format continued to vary in the 1920s, usually along the lines of Amateurs vs Professionals, including one year (1927) where the Professionals were represented by the FA Cup holders Cardiff City and the Amateurs by the Corinthians, echoing the format of the trophy's predecessor, the Sheriff of London Charity Shield.

In 1930, the match returned to being contested by the winners of the Football League and the FA Cup, and with a few exceptions, that format has remained to the present day. Notable exceptions include the 1950 Shield, which involved the England World Cup team against an FA team that had toured Canada that summer, and the 1961 Shield, when Tottenham Hotspur became the first team of the 20th century to win the Double, and so played a Football Association XI.

The game was moved to the start of the season from 1959 onwards. The question of which two teams should contest the Shield should one team win both the FA Cup and League continued to linger. In 1971, Arsenal became the second team to win the Double since the Shield's foundation, but owing to their previously arranged pre-season friendly matches, they could not take part. Leicester City were invited as Division Two champions to play FA Cup runners-up Liverpool instead and went on to win the trophy, despite at the time having never won either the League or the FA Cup.

In 1972, league champions Derby County and FA Cup winners Leeds United both declined to take part in the Charity Shield, so Manchester City, who had finished in fourth in the First Division, and Third Division champions Aston Villa were invited to take part; Manchester City won 1–0. 
After league champions Liverpool and FA Cup winners Sunderland declined to play, despite finishing the season 11th in the league City also contested the 1973 Charity Shield but lost 1–0 to Second Division champions Burnley.

In 1974, the then FA secretary, Ted Croker, created the current format with the match being played at Wembley Stadium, and being contested by the reigning League and FA Cup holders.

Between 1949 and 1991, the Shield was shared on 11 occasions, after the matches ended in a tie. Four drawn games in the 1980s and early 1990s resulted in each team holding the trophy for six months, but in 1993 penalties were re-introduced to decide drawn games.

With the formation of a new top league, the FA Premier League, the Shield became a showcase match between the Premier League and FA Cup winners from the 1993 competition onwards.

In 2002, the Charity Commission found that the Football Association had failed to meet its legal obligations under charity law, by failing to specify what money from ticket sales went to charity, and delaying payments to the charities nominated. As a result, the competition was renamed the Community Shield. Arsenal were the first winners of the renamed Community Shield with a 1–0 victory over Liverpool.

In 2016, the FA's official silversmith Thomas Lyte restored and rebuilt the Football Association's original 1908 Charity Shield to mark 50 years since England beat West Germany in the 1966 FIFA World Cup. The trophy was sold at auction, raising £40,000 for the Bobby Moore Fund for Cancer Research UK. The Bobby Moore Fund became the FA's charity partner in July 2016. The auction was held at The Royal Garden Hotel in Kensington, where the England team celebrated the 1966 victory.

Rules
The rules of the Community Shield are generally the same as those of the Premier League, with a team of 11 starting players and 7 substitutes. However, unlike in most other competitions where only five substitutions are permitted, teams in the Community Shield are permitted up to six substitutions. If the scores are level after 90 minutes, the teams play a penalty shootout. If a team wins both the Premier League and the FA Cup, the runner-up from the Premier League will play.

Status
Serving as England's super cup between the previous season's Premier League champions and FA Cup winners, the Community Shield is regarded as the "curtain-raiser" and is the first competitive game of each top-flight English football season. However, it has been treated with varying degrees of seriousness by participating teams, with some using it similarly to friendlies in their pre-season schedule – as an opportunity to give match practice to fringe members of their squads or those returning from injury. BBC Sport pundit Mark Lawrenson and The Guardian writer Tom Bryant both described the match as a "glorified friendly". Prior to the 2008 FA Community Shield, Manchester United manager Sir Alex Ferguson summarised his opinion of the competition: "The Community Shield is a prestigious match but I have used players in it who were not quite fit... it's always a game we never quite use as a do or die thing; we use it as a barometer for fitness".

Others, however, continue to recognise the status of the match as the first official game and trophy of the domestic season. Ahead of the 2016 FA Community Shield against Manchester United, Leicester City manager Claudio Ranieri asked, "Why do you say this question, a friendly? When is the Community Shield a friendly? Of course we will be at the maximum and Manchester United will be at their maximum. The two teams want to win. I am very excited." The following year, Chelsea manager Antonio Conte affirmed the significance of the cup, stating "It is not a friendly game. It is an official game and there is a trophy so for us it must be important" ahead of his side's clash with Arsenal, the team that had denied his club the double the previous season. Likewise in 2018, Manchester City manager Pep Guardiola referred to his side's clash with Chelsea in the competition as "the first final" of the season.

Records
 The most successful teams in the competition are Manchester United (17 outright wins, 4 shared), Arsenal (15 outright wins, 1 shared), Liverpool (11 outright wins, 5 shared) and Everton (8 outright wins, 1 shared).
 Chelsea (2010, 2012, 2015, 2017 and 2018) and Newcastle United (1932, 1951, 1952, 1955 and 1996) share the joint-longest run of appearances without winning or sharing the trophy.
 The highest scoring game was Manchester United's 8–4 win against Swindon Town in 1911.
 Everton hold the record for most consecutive wins (4) from 1984 to 1987; however, the 1986 'win' was shared with Liverpool. Manchester United hold the record for most consecutive losses (4) from 1998 to 2001. During this period Manchester United also held the record for most consecutive games played (6) from 1996 to 2001 in which they won 2.
 Tottenham Hotspur goalkeeper Pat Jennings scored against Manchester United from his own penalty area in the 1967 Charity Shield, which was shared at 3–3.
 Brighton & Hove Albion are the only club to win just the Shield (in 1910), never the FA Cup or the League. In the five years that the Charity Shield was contested by the winners of the Football League and Southern League between 1908 and 1912, this was the only occasion on which the Southern League champions prevailed. The victory remains Brighton's only national honour to date and they were crowned the 'Champions of all England'.

Venues

For purposes of clarity, venues mentioned in italics in this section no longer exist.

Permanent venues
Since 1974, the Community Shield has been at a permanent home rather than guest venues. 
Old Wembley Stadium: 1974–2000
Millennium Stadium: 2001–2006
New Wembley Stadium: 2007–2011, 2013–2021

Neutral and guest host venues
The fixture was originally played at various neutral grounds or at the home ground of one of the competing teams. In total, there have been eighteen host grounds other than the aforementioned permanent three. The first ground to host the fixture was Stamford Bridge in 1908 and the last ground that guest hosted the fixture was the King Power Stadium in 2022, which was due to Wembley hosting the final of UEFA Women's Euro 2022 on the following day.

Seven clubs have hosted the fixture at their ground on a single occasion: St James' Park in 1932, Roker Park in 1936, Burnden Park in 1958, Turf Moor in 1960, Portman Road in 1962, Anfield in 1964, and Elland Road in 1969.  In addition to these, Leicester City have hosted the fixture twice, once at each of: Filbert Street in 1971 and the King Power Stadium in 2022, bringing the total of one-off host stadia to nine. A further nine grounds have hosted the fixture on multiple occasions (see table).

Notes

Winners

By year

By number of wins (clubs)

By number of wins (other)

Winners and runners-up by competition

Notes

References

External links

 

 
National association football supercups
!Community shield
Recurring sporting events established in 1908
1908 establishments in England
Annual sporting events in the United Kingdom
Charity events in the United Kingdom
Charity football matches